The Chambers–Morgan Farm is a historic farm and national historic district located near White Store, Anson County, North Carolina, United States.  It includes four contributing buildings, three contributing sites, and six contributing structures.  They include the Greek Revival style Chambers–Morgan House (1829); blacksmith shop, "light house", car shed (1930s), two corn cribs (c. 1910), barn (c. 1910), cemetery (1830–1866), well, pump house (c. 1940), two ponds, and the farm landscape.

It was listed on the National Register of Historic Places in 1996.

References

Historic districts on the National Register of Historic Places in North Carolina
Farms on the National Register of Historic Places in North Carolina
Greek Revival houses in North Carolina
Houses completed in 1829
Buildings and structures in Anson County, North Carolina
National Register of Historic Places in Anson County, North Carolina